Nižná Voľa (Nyzhnia Volia) is a village and municipality in Bardejov District in the Prešov Region of north-east Slovakia. There is a church built in 1823-1826 which is being used by both religions (Greek and Roman Catholics).

History
In historical records the village was first mentioned in 1310

Geography
The municipality lies at an altitude of 270 metres and covers an area of 7.174 km².
It has a population of about 300 people.

External links
 
https://web.archive.org/web/20070513023228/http://www.statistics.sk/mosmis/eng/run.html

Villages and municipalities in Bardejov District
Šariš